Lupematasila Galumalemana Tologata Togia Tile Leia (born ~1964) is a Samoan politician. He is a member of the Human Rights Protection Party.

Lupematasila was educated at Avele College, the Papua New Guinea University of Technology, La Trobe University in Australia and Massey University in New Zealand. He joined the Electric Power Corporation in 1987 and in 2011 was appointed General Manager. He was first elected to the Legislative Assembly of Samoa in the 2021 Samoan general election.

References

Living people
Members of the Legislative Assembly of Samoa
Human Rights Protection Party politicians
Samoan civil servants
La Trobe University alumni
Massey University alumni
Year of birth missing (living people)